Hedong Subdistrict is one of the two subdistricts, the other being Hexi, of the city of Delingha, Qinghai, People's Republic of China. The seat of the Haixi Mongol and Tibetan Autonomous Prefecture is located here, and this is the more urbanised part of Delingha City. , it has four residential communities and three villages under its administration.

References

Township-level divisions of Qinghai
Delingha